Sir Jonathan Trelawny, 3rd Baronet (24 March 1650 – 19 July 1721) was an English Bishop of Bristol, Bishop of Exeter and Bishop of Winchester. Trelawny is best known for his role in the events leading up to the Glorious Revolution which are sometimes believed to be referenced in the Cornish anthem "The Song of the Western Men".

Life
He was born at Trelawne in the parish of Pelynt, Cornwall, the eldest surviving son of Sir Jonathan Trelawny, 2nd Baronet, and Mary Seymour, daughter of Sir Edward Seymour, 2nd Baronet. He was educated at Westminster School and then went to Christ Church, Oxford at the start of the Michaelmas term of 1668 where he distinguished himself as a scholar.

A staunch royalist, he was ordained in 1673 and became a beneficed clergyman. He was appointed rector of South Hill on 4 October and of St. Ives on 12 December 1677, becoming Bishop of Bristol in 1685. He was one of the Seven Bishops tried for seditious libel under James II. Trelawny and the other bishops petitioned against James II's Declaration of Indulgence in 1687 and 1688, (granting religious tolerance to Catholics) and as a result, he was arrested and imprisoned in the Tower of London on charges of seditious libel. The bishops said that whilst they were loyal to King James II, their consciences would not agree to allowing freedom of worship to Catholics even if it were to be within the privacy of their own homes as the Declaration proposed; thus they could not sign. Trelawny was held for three weeks before trial, then tried and acquitted; this led to great celebrations, with bells being rung in his home parish of Pelynt.

Trelawny was rewarded in 1689 by being appointed Bishop of Exeter (whilst still, until 1694, Archdeacon of Totnes) after the military defeat of James II and the accession of the Protestant William of Orange to the British throne. He was further rewarded by being appointed Bishop of Winchester in 1707, although his promotion was a matter of some controversy, as Queen Anne, who was determined to keep all important Church appointments within her own gift, overruled the advice of her ministers and of Thomas Tenison, the Archbishop of Canterbury in appointing him, thus provoking the so-called Bishoprics Crisis. He died in 1721, in Chelsea, Middlesex; his body was taken back to Pelynt for burial.

Family
He married Rebecca Hele, by whom he had twelve children:
Charlotte Trelawny (1687/8 – aft. 1745), unmarried
Letitia Trelawny (b. 1689), married Sir Harry Trelawny, 5th Baronet
Sir John Trelawny, 4th Baronet (1691–1756)
Henry Trelawny (1692–1707), fought in the War of the Spanish Succession and died with Admiral Sir Cloudesley Shovell aboard HMS Association during the Scilly naval disaster of 1707.
Charles Trelawny (1694 – 24 August 1721), without issue, prebendary of Westminster
Rebecca Trelawny (1696–1743), married John Francis Buller in 1716
Elizabeth Trelawny (1697 – 25 January 1744), married Rev. George Allanson (d. 1741), Archdeacon of Cornwall
Edward Trelawny (1699–1754), became governor of Jamaica
Mary Trelawny (b. 1700), died in infancy
Rev. Hele Trelawny (1703–1740), without issue
Jonathan Trelawny (b. 1705), died in infancy
Anne Trelawny (1707–1745), unmarried

Reputation

It is sometimes suggested that Bishop Trelawny was immortalised in the Cornish Anthem, "The Song of the Western Men", better known simply as "Trelawny", written over a century later and composed by Parson Robert Stephen Hawker, vicar of Morwenstow.

And shall Trelawny live?
Or shall Trelawny die!
Here's twenty thousand Cornish men
Will know the reason why!

See also

 List of deserters from James II to William of Orange

Notes

References

External links
Who was Trelawny? by Tom Prout, Editor of the Trelawny's Army Newsletter.

|-

People from Pelynt
1650 births
1721 deaths
People educated at Westminster School, London
Alumni of Christ Church, Oxford
Christianity in Cornwall
Archdeacons of Totnes
Bishops of Bristol
Bishops of Exeter
Bishops of Winchester
Baronets in the Baronetage of England
17th-century Church of England bishops
18th-century Church of England bishops